Statistics of Dhivehi League in the 2000 season.

Overview
Victory Sports Club won both the Dhivehi League and the Maldives National Championship.

References
RSSSF

Dhivehi League seasons
Maldives
Maldives
1